The 2012 Indian Premier League Final was a day/night Twenty20 cricket match on 27 May 2012 at the M A Chidambaram Stadium, Chennai, which was played between Chennai Super Kings and Kolkata Knight Riders to determine the winner of the 2012 season of the Indian Premier League, an annual Twenty20 cricket tournament in India.

Chennai Super Kings voted to bat first as they won the toss and set up a big total of 190/3 off 20 overs for their opposition. Kolkata Knight Riders chased the total successfully with 2-balls to spare losing 5 wickets in the process and secured the 2012 Indian Premier League trophy, which happens to be their maiden title in the history of the tournament.

Manvinder Bisla of Kolkata Knight Riders was declared the "man of the match" in the Final, Sunil Narine of Kolkata Knight Riders was declared the most valuable player of the tournament and Mandeep Singh of Kings XI Punjab was declared as the emerging player of the season for the 2012 Indian Premier League.

Road to the final

League stage

League stage series

Playoff stage

Match Summary
The final between the defending two-time champions Chennai Super Kings and the first-time finalists Kolkata Knight Riders was held at the M. A. Chidambaram Stadium, Chennai on 27 May 2012. While the Super Kings retained their team from the Qualifier, a hamstring injury to Knight Riders medium-pace bowler Lakshmipathy Balaji resulted the inclusion of Australian Brett Lee and this inclusion of another foreign player required the Knight Riders to leave out their former captain and wicket-keeper batsman Brendon McCullum of New Zealand to maintain the cap of 4 foreign players. Wicket-keeper batsman Manvinder Bisla was brought in to replace Brendon McCullum.

After Super Kings captain Mahendra Singh Dhoni won the toss and elected to bat first, openers Murali Vijay and Mike Hussey put on an opening partnership of 87 until Vijay was dismissed for 42 (from 32 balls) in the 11th over. Mike Hussey was joined by IPL's leading run scorer Suresh Raina and they scored at a brisk rate to reach 160 when Hussey was dismissed in the eighteenth over for 54 (from 43 balls). Suresh Raina who had scored an imposing 73 (from 38 balls) with five sixes was dismissed off the last ball as Chennai reached a formidable total of 190. In reply, the Knight Riders lost their captain Gautam Gambhir cheaply for 2 in the first over. However, they recovered as Manvinder Bisla (89 from 48 balls) and Jacques Kallis (69 from 49 balls) added 136 for the second wicket. Soon after Bisla's dismissal in the 15th over, the Knight Riders lost wickets at regular intervals and after Kallis was caught out by Ravindra Jadeja off the bowling of Ben Hilfenhaus at 18.5 overs, the Knight Riders required 16 runs from the last 7 balls. Shakib Al Hasan appeared to have been caught by Murali Vijay off the very next delivery from Hilfenhaus but it happened to be a no-ball and amid the celebrations, Shakib Al Hasan had completed two runs and retained the strike and hit a four the very next ball. Needing 9 runs to win from the last over, Manoj Tiwary hit consecutive fours to secure victory for the Knight Riders. Manvinder Bisla was declared Man of the Match for his 89 from 48 balls which included five sixes and eight fours.

Scorecard
 On-field umpires: Billy Bowden, Simon Taufel
 Third umpire: Billy Doctrove
 Match referee: Ranjan Madugalle
 Reserve umpire: Krishnamachari Srinivasan
 Toss: Chennai Super Kings voted to bat first
 Result: Kolkata Knight Riders won by five wickets
 League impact: Kolkata Knight Riders won at the 2012 Indian Premier League

Source : Full scorecard on Cricinfo

Key
 * – Captain
  – Wicket-keeper
 c Fielder – the batsman was dismissed by a catch by the named fielder
 b Bowler – the bowler who gains credit for the dismissal
 lbw – the batsman was dismissed leg before wicket
 Total runs are in the format: score/wickets
 b  – Bye, lb  – Leg bye, nb  – No-ball, wd  – Wide, RR  – Run rate

References

Final
Indian Premier League Final
Indian Premier League Final